Buteh Mordeh (also Romanized as Būteh Mordeh; also known as Bauta Māurdeh, Boteh Mordeh-ye Bālā, Boteh Mordeh-ye ‘Olyā, Būtā Mā’ūrdeh, and Bābānaẓar) is a village in Pain Velayat Rural District, Razaviyeh District, Mashhad County, Razavi Khorasan Province, Iran. At the 2006 census, its population was 66, in 20 families.

References 

Populated places in Mashhad County